Sweetheart is a 2016 Bangladeshi romantic drama film written by S. Reza and directed by Wazed Ali Sumon. The film stars Bappy Chowdhury, Bidya Sinha Mim, Riaz Uddin Ahamed Siddique with Shampa Reza and Parveen Sultana Diti in supporting roles.

Riaz plays Richard, the only heir of an established business dynasty who is in love with Prilina, a childhood friend, portrayed by Mim. Before going to London for higher education, Richard gets engaged to Prilina. While Richard is away, Prilina gets close to Jishan, played by Bappy. Two becomes closer as they spend time together, Prilina realizes her feelings for Jishan. Meanwhile, Richard returns from abroad. Divided by religion, and nonacceptance from society, the lives of three individuals ends in tragedy.

Sweetheart first look was officially launched on 17 May 2015 by Tiger Media Limited and second teaser was revealed a month later. The Official Trailer of the film was revealed on 30 January 2016. The film is produced by A.S Raj under the banner of Digital Movies. The film soundtrack album was launched on 8 February 2016 at Star Cineplex and received tremendous response from audiences since then. The film is released in 80 screens on 12 February 2016.

Plot
Bilina (Mim) and Richard (Riaz) belongs to traditional Christian family. Growing up together, Bilina and Richard gets accustomed to each other's accompany. During teenage years, Richard goes to London for higher studies. While Richard is away, Bilina gets to know Zishan (Bappy), who belongs to a Muslim family. As the time passes, their friendship turns to love. However, in the meantime, Richard returns to Bilina and proposes to her, and Bilina accepts due to immense pressure from community and family. Unknown about the feelings Bilina have for Zishan, Richard marries her and soon after, however their marriage remain complicated.

Zishan, heartbroken by the treachery of Bilina, thinks that Bilina left him because of Richard's wealth, and vows to build an empire of wealth. As the film turns complex, the story of the film revolves around the love triangle between three individuals, whose love turns to utmost hate.

Cast
 Bappy Chowdhury as Zishan, Bilina's love interest
 Bidya Sinha Mim as Bilina Rosario
 Parveen Sultana Diti, Jishan's mother
 Khosheduzamman Utpal, Richard's father, a multi-millionaire businessman
 Shampa Reza as Mariah Rosario, Bilina's mother
 Prabir Mitra, a manager working at Jishan's business
 Neel
 Rex Jafor as Anamul
 Riaz Uddin Ahamed Siddique as Richard, a British millionaire and Bilina's childhood friend (Special Appearance)

Production

Casting
The film was first announced in 2013, with Mim and Bappy selected for the lead roles. Numerous media outlets reported that Mamnun Hasan Emon was approached to play a lead role in the film. However, Riaz Uddin Ahamed Siddiqui was later approached to play the role of Richard.

Filming
Principal photography started in November 2014 with Mim and Bappy. The first phase of the shooting was done in Dhaka, while about 20 percent of the film and songs were shot in Malaysia. The film was extensively shot for 45 days in Dhaka while 12 days in Malaysia.

Release
The film was intended to be released during July 2015, however, the date was postponed due to post-production. The film premiered at the Star Cineplex at Bashundhara City on 10 February 2016. The makers of the film went to release the film on 12 February 2016, on the occasion of Valentine's Day. The film was praised by critics and many production companies around the country, including Jaaz Multimedia. The film was released on 12 February on 81 screens in Bangladesh.

Music

Sweetheart's film score is composed by Shafiq Tuhin with songs composed by Habib Wahid, Hridoy Khan, and Ahmed Humayun. and lyrics written by Sudip Kumar Dip and Kabir Bakul. The first track titled "Ek Mutho Prem" was released on 23 March 2015 as the first single prior to the soundtrack album's release. The second single to be released was "Kenore Tor Majhe". The album features five tracks, and was released August 2015. Tiger Media Limited acquired the music rights of the film.

Track listing

References

External links
 
 

2016 films
Bengali-language Bangladeshi films
2016 romantic drama films
Bangladeshi romantic drama films
Films shot in Dhaka
Films shot in Malaysia
Films shot in Thailand
2010s musical drama films
2010s romantic musical films
Films scored by Hridoy Khan
Films scored by Ahmed Humayun
Films scored by Habib Wahid
2010s Bengali-language films
Films directed by Wajed Ali Sumon